Gottröra is a village in Norrtälje Municipality in the province of Uppland, Sweden. Several hundred ancient monuments are registered in Gottröra.

On 27 December 1991, Scandinavian Airlines Flight 751 made an emergency landing near Gottröra.

References

Populated places in Norrtälje Municipality